Duneraiders is a 1984 fantasy role-playing game adventure published by Gamelords for Traveller.

Plot summary
Duneraiders is an adventure set on the desert world of Tashrakaar involving rival off-world mining companies. It utilized the rules from The Desert Environment by the same author.

Publication history
Duneraiders was written by William H. Keith Jr. and was published in 1984 by Gamelords as a digest-sized 60-page book.

Reception
Tony Watson reviewed Duneraiders in Space Gamer No. 72. Watson commented that "The scenario in Duneraiders is a good one, backed up by some interesting detail and local color. There's a good feeling for adventure in the dry wastes of the deep desert, and just about any playing group should find the situation challenging."

Steve Nutt reviewed Duneraiders for Imagine magazine, and stated that "The adventure is well presented and laid out, and is comprehensive. The planetary background is detailed. with lots of maps and a deck plan of the mining vehicle provided. At all points of the adventure the referee has all the information needed; this is rare nowadays, with so many scenarios needing work on them before they can be played."

Reviews
 Different Worlds #42 (May/June, 1986)

References

Role-playing game supplements introduced in 1984
Traveller (role-playing game) adventures